Deliverance was a German-Canadian Christian pop and rock music band that was active in the 1970s until 1981.

History
Danny Janz, Ken Janz, and Paul Janz formed Deliverance in Lörrach, Germany though the three were from Calgary, Canada. All three were raised in Basel, Switzerland and attended Black Forest Academy. Danny and Paul Janz had already performed together as "Danny and Paul" but joined with Ken in 1974 to form Deliverance – combining the "Janz Team Singers" with "Danny, Paul & Wayne" and created a dynamic new band. Guy Roellinger and Dave McSparran also joined the band during its history. The band released four albums before Paul Janz embarked on a solo career.

The group had a minor hit in 1979 with "Leaving L.A.", which reached No. 71 on the Billboard Hot 100.

After legal troubles concerning the band's name and a copyright suit the band named itself Janz and recorded a single in 1981 titled Steine which went No. 1 in German Charts. Still they were advised by their attorney not to record a full-length album yet. The band parted shortly after that when Paul Janz left Germany to go back to Canada.

Discography

Studio albums
 To God Be the Glory (1976)
 Give It a Try (1977)
 Lasting Impressions (1978)
 Tightrope (1979)

Singles

Related singles
 Janz Team Singers and Danny & Paul – "Ein wunderbares Heil" (1971)
 Janz Team Singers and Danny & Paul – "Reach Out to Jesus" (1971)
 Janz Team Singers and Danny & Paul – "Ohne Jesus" (1972)
 Janz – "Steine" (1981)

References

External links
http://www.canadianbands.com/Paul%20Janz.html
Jam! Canadian Pop Encyclopedia Entry
Lasting Impressions Blog fan blog

Canadian pop rock music groups
Canadian Christian rock groups
Musical groups established in 1974
Musical groups disestablished in 1981
1974 establishments in Canada
1981 disestablishments in Canada